Malamas is a Greek surname. Notable people with the surname include:

Ilias Malamas (born 1966), Greek swimmer
Sokratis Malamas (born 1957), Greek singer and songwriter

See also
Malama (disambiguation), a given name and surname

Greek-language surnames